Cozma is a Romanian surname. Notable people with the surname include:

 Miron Cozma (born 1945), Romanian labor union organizer
 Ionela Cozma, Romanian swimmer
 Marian Cozma (1982–2009), Romanian handball player
 Valentina Cozma, Romanian handball player

Romanian-language surnames